Gianluigi Buffon  (born 28 January 1978) is an Italian professional footballer who captains and plays as a goalkeeper for the  club Parma. He is widely regarded as one of the greatest goalkeepers of all time. He is one of the few recorded players to have made over 1,100 professional career appearances.

At club level, Buffon's professional career began with Parma in 1995, where he made his Serie A debut. He soon broke into the starting line-up and earned a reputation as one of the most promising young goalkeepers in Italy, helping Parma to win the Coppa Italia, the UEFA Cup and the Supercoppa Italiana in 1999. After joining Juventus in 2001, for the world record fee for a goalkeeper of €52 million at the time, Buffon won Serie A titles in both of his first two seasons at the club, and established himself as one of the best players in the world in his position. In his first spell at Juventus, he won a record nine Serie A titles, four Coppa Italias, and five Supercoppa Italianas. He was the first goalkeeper to win the Serie A Footballer of the Year award, and was named Serie A Goalkeeper of the Year a record twelve times. 

After reaching the 2015 and 2017 UEFA Champions League finals, he was named to the Champions League Squad of the Season on both occasions, and won the inaugural The Best FIFA Goalkeeper award in the latter year. After 17 years with Juventus, Buffon signed with French club Paris Saint-Germain at the age of 40 in 2018, where he was used in a rotational role with Alphonse Areola; he won the Trophée des Champions and the Ligue 1 title in his only season with the team, before returning to Juventus the following year. During the 2019–20 season, Buffon served primarily as a back-up to Wojciech Szczęsny, but still managed to break Paolo Maldini's record of 647 appearances in Serie A, as he won a record tenth Serie A title with the club. The following season he continued to serve as a back-up, but started in the Coppa Italia, winning his record sixth title. In June 2021, he returned to his boyhood club Parma, who were relegated to Serie B for that season.

With 176 international caps, Buffon is the most capped player in the history of the Italy national team, the seventh-most capped footballer of all time (joint with Hossam Hassan), and the third-most capped European international player ever; Buffon also holds the record for most appearances for Italy as captain after he inherited the armband in 2010. Buffon was called up for a record of five FIFA World Cup tournaments (in 1998, 2002, 2006, 2010 and 2014) after making his debut in 1997; he was an unused substitute in the 1998 edition. He was the starting goalkeeper of the squad that won the 2006 tournament, being awarded the Golden Glove as the competition's best goalkeeper. He also represented Italy at four European Championships, at the 1996 Olympics, and at two FIFA Confederations Cups, winning a bronze medal in the 2013 edition of the tournament. Following his performances during the 2006 World Cup, where he kept a record five clean sheets, Buffon won the Yashin Award and was elected to the Team of the Tournament, an honour he also received from UEFA after reaching the quarter-finals of the 2008 and the final of the 2012 European Championship. Buffon retired from international football in 2017, after Italy failed to qualify for the 2018 FIFA World Cup; although he reversed this decision to play in the team's friendlies the following year, he officially confirmed his international retirement in May 2018.

Buffon was named by Pelé in the FIFA 100 list of the world's greatest living players in 2004. He is the only goalkeeper to win the UEFA Club Footballer of the Year award, which he achieved after reaching the 2003 UEFA Champions League Final; he also won UEFA's award for best goalkeeper that year, and was additionally voted into the UEFA Team of the Year on five occasions. Buffon was the runner-up for the Ballon d'Or in 2006, and was elected part of the FIFPro World11 three times. He was the first ever goalkeeper to win the Golden Foot Award, and was also named the IFFHS World's Best Goalkeeper a record five times (alongside Iker Casillas and Manuel Neuer); he would go on to be named the best goalkeeper of the 21st century, of the past 25 years and of the decade by the same organisation.

Early life 
Buffon was born in Carrara, Tuscany, although he is of Friulian origin, from Latisana. He was born into a sporting family: his mother Maria Stella Masocco was three times Italian champion in shot put and discus throw, his uncle Dante Masocco was a basketball player who played in the Italian Serie A1, his father Adriano also practiced shot put, and his elder sisters Guendalina and Veronica were professional volleyball players. He is a relative of Lorenzo Buffon, goalkeeper for Milan, Genoa, Inter, Fiorentina and the Italian national team: Lorenzo is second cousin of Gianluigi's grandfather.

In June 2017, he received honorary citizenship from the city of Latisana.

Club career

Parma

1991–1994: Youth career and early professional career 

Despite offers from Bologna and Milan, Buffon began his career with the Parma youth system in 1991, at the age of 13. During his time in the youth academy, he initially played in several out-field positions, in particular as a midfielder, before switching to his current position of goalkeeper. His idol Thomas N'Kono inspired this change of position due to his notable goalkeeping performances for Cameroon at the 1990 World Cup in Italy; as a result, when both of the Parma youth team's keepers suddenly suffered injuries, Buffon was called upon due to his interest, height and physical attributes. He quickly adapted to this role, and within two weeks he had been promoted to first keeper of the Parma youth team. Ermes Fulgoni, the academy's goalkeeping coach, would soon become a mentor to the young goalkeeper.

Buffon made notable saves against Ballon d'Or winners Roberto Baggio and George Weah, as well as Marco Simone, throughout the match. Buffon went on to make seven more first team appearances that season as well as one appearance in the Coppa Italia, making his debut in the competition, as Parma were eliminated in the second round. Parma finished in sixth place in Serie A that season, qualifying for the UEFA Cup. During his time at Parma, he trained under goalkeeping coach Villiam Vecchi, a person to whom Buffon attributes much of his confidence, development, and success.

1996–2001: Making the starting eleven, early success and recognition 
In the 1996–97 Serie A season, his second full season with the club, Buffon was named as the starting goalkeeper ahead of Luca Bucci, and Alessandro Nista. Parma finished the 1996–97 season as runners-up in Serie A, behind Juventus, qualifying for the UEFA Champions League. Buffon conceded 17 goals in 27 appearances, and his consistent performances began to gain attention in Italy. Parma were once again eliminated in the second round of the Coppa Italia and in the first round of the UEFA Cup that season, where Buffon made his European debut in a 2–0 defeat to Portuguese club Vitória de Guimarães on 24 September 1996, aged .

In the 1997–98 season, Parma finished in fifth place in Serie A and reached the Coppa Italia semi-finals. Buffon also made his debut in the UEFA Champions League that season: his first appearance came in a 3–1 away win over Widzew Łódź on 13 August 1997, in the first leg of the second qualifying round, aged , while he made his debut in the group stage in a 2–0 home victory against Galatasaray on 1 October later that year, aged ; Parma were ultimately knocked out in the first round of the competition, finishing second in their group, behind defending champions Borussia Dortmund. Buffon acquired his nickname "Superman" during the course of the season, when he stopped a penalty by Inter striker and Ballon d'Or holder Ronaldo. Buffon celebrated the save by showing the Parma fans a Superman T-shirt, which he was wearing underneath his jersey; the nickname was also a reference to Buffon's athleticism, agility and aerial ability.
 
In his fourth season with the club, Buffon won his first European trophy, the UEFA Cup, keeping a clean sheet in the final against Marseille, which ended in a 3–0 win for Parma; he also won the Coppa Italia with the club that season, as Parma defeated Fiorentina on away goals. Parma finished fourth in Serie A, which allowed them to reach the playoff round of the UEFA Champions League, although they were relegated to the UEFA Cup after losing to Rangers. Buffon's performances that season earned him his first Serie A Goalkeeper of the Year Award, as well as the Bravo Award, the trophy given to the best player under 23 years of age in Europe. He also placed fifth in the IFFHS World's Best Goalkeeper rankings, and received his first ever Ballon d'Or nomination.

In the following season, he won his first Supercoppa Italiana title against Serie A champions Milan, and Parma finished fourth in Serie A once again, tied with Inter for the final remaining Champions League spot. Parma lost 3–1 to Inter in the European playoff match. The club was knocked out in the round of 16 of both the UEFA Cup and the Coppa Italia.

In the 2000–01 season, Buffon helped lead Parma to another Coppa Italia Final, in which they were defeated by Fiorentina; but the team suffered a third-round elimination in the UEFA Cup. Parma also finished the season in fourth place for the third consecutive year, which allowed them to go through to the Champions League play-off round. Buffon was voted Serie A Goalkeeper of the Year for the second time in his career, and he also placed third in the IFFHS World's Best Goalkeeper award.

On 3 July 2001, Buffon was sold to Juventus for a world-record goalkeeper's transfer fee of 100 billion lire, (€51,645,690) (Or €51.956 million including other minor costs that could be capitalised) with part of the transfer fees paid via the transfer of Jonathan Bachini to Parma for an undisclosed fee (which saw Juventus make a capital gain of €10M, i.e. he was sold for equal to or more than €10M).

Juventus

2001–2004: Initial dominance 
Buffon transferred from Parma to Juventus on 3 July 2001 for €52 million, along with former Parma teammate Lilian Thuram, and was handed the number 1 shirt as the starting goalkeeper, replacing Edwin van der Sar, who was sold to Fulham. Buffon later said that there had been an initial possibility for him to join Roma, but they signed Ivan Pelizzoli instead, and although negotiations were ongoing with Barcelona, he chose Juventus because his father convinced him he would be likely to achieve his ambition of winning the Scudetto. This transfer fee made Buffon Juventus' most expensive purchase ever, a record which was broken in 2016 by the acquisition of Gonzalo Higuaín.

Buffon made his Juventus debut during the opening match of the 2001–02 Serie A season, on 26 August 2001, keeping a clean sheet in a 4–0 home win over Venezia. He kept two more clean sheets until he was beaten by Massimo Marazzina in a 3–2 home win over Chievo on the fourth match-day. He made his Juventus Champions League debut on 18 September, in a 3–2 home win over Celtic. In his first season with Juventus, Buffon appeared in 45 official matches, helping his team to the Serie A title, as Juventus finished the season with the best defence in Italy, with Buffon only conceding 22 goals in 34 Serie A matches. Juventus also finished as runners-up in the Coppa Italia that season to Buffon's former club, Parma; Buffon only made one appearance in the competition. Juventus were eliminated in the second group stage of the UEFA Champions League. Despite coming under criticism in the media for some errors early on in the season, in particular against Chievo, Buffon was awarded his third Serie A Goalkeeper of the Year Award at the end of the season for his performances throughout the year, and he was nominated for the UEFA Team of the Year for the first time in his career, losing out to Rüştü Reçber.

At the beginning of the 2002–03 season, Juventus won the 2002 Supercoppa Italiana against Parma. Buffon had a dominant year, totalling 47 appearances in all competitions, of which 32 were in Serie A. He helped Juventus to the UEFA Champions League Final, only for his team to lose in a penalty shoot-out to Milan after a 0–0 draw at Old Trafford following extra time. Buffon managed to save two penalties, but Milan won the shootout 3–2. Buffon drew praise for making a reaction save from a close-range header by Filippo Inzaghi in the final during regulation time, which he later described as the most difficult save of his career in his 2008 autobiography, and as one of the most beautiful in 2014. Buffon saved a Luís Figo penalty in the second leg of the semi-finals, against defending champions Real Madrid, in Turin. Juventus progressed to the final, winning 4–3 on aggregate. Juventus managed to celebrate their second consecutive Serie A title that season, finishing the season with the best defence yet again, as Buffon conceded only 23 goals in 32 appearances. In 2003, Buffon received the Serie A Goalkeeper of the Year for the fourth time. He also became the only goalkeeper ever to win the now defunct UEFA Most Valuable Player or UEFA Club Footballer of the Year award. He also won the UEFA Best Goalkeeper award, and was elected to the UEFA Team of the Year for the first time. He was also named the IFFHS World's Best Goalkeeper for the first time in his career. Buffon was also nominated for the 2003 Ballon d'Or that season, finishing in ninth place.

Buffon began the 2003–04 season with Juventus by defeating Milan on penalties in the 2003 Supercoppa Italiana, with Buffon saving a penalty in the shootout, after a 1–1 draw. Juventus were eliminated in the round of 16 of the Champions League that season by Deportivo de La Coruña and finished the Serie A season in a disappointing third place, although they managed to reach the Coppa Italia Final. Buffon made his 100th appearance for Juventus that season on 30 September 2003 in a 2–1 away win over Olympiacos in the group stage of the Champions League. He was named by Pelé as one of the top 125 greatest living footballers in March 2004, but missed out on the Serie A Goalkeeper of the Year award, which went to Milan's league-winning goalkeeper Dida. He was once again elected as the Goalkeeper for the UEFA Team of the Year and as the IFFHS World's Best Goalkeeper. Buffon also received his first ever FIFA World Player of the Year nomination in 2004, finishing in 21st place alongside countryman Paolo Maldini.

2004–2006: Calciopoli and relegation 
In the summer of 2004, Marcello Lippi left Juventus to take charge of the Italy national team and was replaced by Fabio Capello. In his fourth season with the club, Buffon made 38 appearances in Serie A and 48 in all competitions that season as he won his third Serie A title in four years with Juventus, winning once again the Serie A Goalkeeper of the Year award for the fifth time in his career. Juventus were knocked out in the quarter-finals of the Champions League, against eventual winners Liverpool, and in 2005, Buffon was nominated for the UEFA Team of the Year for the fourth consecutive year.

In August 2005, Buffon collided with Milan midfielder Kaká during the annual preseason Trofeo Luigi Berlusconi match, suffering a dislocated shoulder that required surgery. Milan loaned backup goalkeeper Christian Abbiati to Juventus as compensation while Buffon recovered. Buffon returned to the Juventus starting line-up in November, but injury again sidelined him until January. He recovered in time to help Juventus win their second consecutive Scudetto and his fourth overall, returning to the starting line-up in January 2006, in a Coppa Italia match against Fiorentina. Juventus were once again knocked out in the quarter-finals of the Champions League by runners-up Arsenal, and in the quarter-finals of the Coppa Italia on away goals to eventual runners-up Roma. Buffon was named IFFHS World's Best Goalkeeper for the third time in his career and Serie A Goalkeeper of the Year for the sixth time. He was also placed second in the 2006 Ballon d'Or and eighth in the FIFA World Player of the Year Award behind his winning Italy teammate Fabio Cannavaro, and was elected as the starting goalkeeper for both the 2006 FIFPro XI and the UEFA Team of the Year, following his fifth consecutive nomination. Buffon made his 200th appearance for Juventus that season in a 2–0 away defeat at the hands of Arsenal in the quarter-finals of the Champions League.

On 12 May 2006, several players, including Buffon, were accused of participating in illegal betting on Serie A matches. Buffon voluntarily co-operated, allowing himself to be interrogated by Turin magistrates. While admitting that he did place bets on sporting matches (until regulations went into effect in late 2005, banning players from doing so), he vehemently denied placing wagers on Italian football matches. Despite concerns that he had jeopardised his chance of playing for Italy in the 2006 World Cup, he was officially named Italy's starting goalkeeper on 15 May and helped Italy to win their fourth title. Buffon was cleared of all charges by the Italian Football Federation (FIGC) on 27 June 2007. Following Juventus' punishment in the Calciopoli scandal, in which their two most recent Serie A titles were stripped and the squad were relegated to Serie B and penalised with a point deduction, rumours spread that Buffon would be placed on the transfer market. Buffon elected to remain with Juventus, despite the team's relegation, a decision which made him extremely popular with the Juventus fans.

2006–2011: Serie B champions, Serie A return and post-Calciopoli struggles 

During the 2006–07 Serie B season, Buffon made his debut in the Italian second division in a 1–1 away draw against Rimini on 9 September 2006; later that year, he also received the first red card of his career in a 1–1 away draw against AlbinoLeffe on 18 November. In total he made 37 league appearances throughout the season. After Juventus won the Serie B title, earning promotion to Serie A for the 2007–08 season, Buffon signed a contract extension with Juventus until 2012. In 2007, Buffon was also elected as the goalkeeper for the 2007 FIFPro XI for the second consecutive year, and the IFFHS World's Best Goalkeeper for a record-breaking fourth time.

Buffon was a key player for Juventus in the 2007–08 season, their first back in the top flight, as he helped Juventus to a third-place finish, and Champions League qualification. Juventus lost to runners-up Inter in the Coppa Italia quarter-finals. Buffon produced 94 saves in 34 league appearances and was named Serie A Goalkeeper of the Year for the seventh time in his career. Buffon was also nominated for the 2008 Ballon d'Or for the sixth consecutive time in his career since 2003, and the FIFA World Player of the Year Award. During this season, Buffon began to suffer problems with his back, caused by a herniated disc, which frequently keep him sidelined during the next few seasons. On 10 March 2008, Buffon renewed his contract until 2013, expressing his desire to win everything with the club.

In the 2008–09 season, Buffon was once again sidelined by several injuries. From September through January, reserve goalkeeper Alexander Manninger held his position between the sticks, gaining praise for his deputising. Due to recurring injuries, Manninger's performances and Juventus' poor form towards the end of the season (as Buffon was seen despondent whilst the team drew with both Lecce and Atalanta), there were further rumours that Buffon was displeased and wanted to part ways with the club. He admitted he was disappointed with the current results, but assured that he had no intention of leaving. After a discussion with management, he said he was reassured about the club's future and signed a contract extension to 2013. Buffon and Juventus finished the season on a high note, with two victories, finishing in second place behind Internazionale. They were knocked out of the Coppa Italia semi-finals by eventual champions Lazio and of the Champions League in the round of 16 by Chelsea. Buffon was nominated for the FIFA World Player of the Year in 2009 for the sixth consecutive season since first being nominated in 2004. Buffon made his 300th appearance for Juventus in a 3–3 home draw against Chievo in 2009.

Juventus and Buffon began the 2009–10 season strongly, although the squad suffered a severe dip in form as they were eliminated from the Champions League, finishing third in their group. They were subsequently eliminated in the Round of 16 of the Europa League against Fulham. Juventus were knocked out in the quarter-finals of the Coppa Italia to eventual champions Inter, and finished the Serie A season in a disappointing seventh place, only qualifying for the 2010–11 Europa League through the playoff round. Buffon was often sidelined that season, due to several recurring injuries. In 2010, Buffon was voted goalkeeper of the decade by IFFHS.

Buffon did not play for the first half of the 2010–11 season as he was recovering from surgery after an injury he endured to his sciatic nerve during the 2010 World Cup, and he was replaced by his new deputy, Marco Storari. Juventus were knocked out of the Europa League group stage, the Coppa Italia in the quarter-finals and finished the Serie A season in seventh place, failing to qualify for Europe, the first time since the 1990–91 season.

2011–2014: New era of dominance in Serie A 
During the 2011–12 season under new manager and former club midfielder Antonio Conte, Juventus were once again a dominating force in Serie A. Buffon re-found his form, and made numerous notable saves throughout the season, including stopping a penalty kick from Francesco Totti, which enabled Juventus to capture a crucial draw against Roma at the Stadio Olimpico in Rome. Buffon's fine form at the end of the first half of the season saw elected Juventus' Player of the Month in December 2011 by fans. Buffon kept his 15th clean sheet of the season in Juventus' victory over rivals Inter in the Derby d'Italia; after the match, he was described as "the best goalkeeper in Italy and probably the World". Juventus finished the season unbeaten, winning their first Scudetto since the Calciopoli scandal, and qualifying for the 2012–13 Champions League after a two-year absence. Buffon described it as the second highest point of his career, after the 2006 World Cup victory.

Playing behind a strong three-man defensive line under Conte's newly established 3–5–2 formation, made up predominantly of Giorgio Chiellini, Leonardo Bonucci and Andrea Barzagli, Buffon obtained a league record of 21 clean sheets in Serie A, and only conceded a personal best of 16 goals from 35 appearances (an average of 0.46 goals per game), as Juventus finished the season with the best defence in Italy, and became the European team with the second-best defence that season, after Porto. Buffon made 81 saves in Serie A that season and his 82% save percentage was the highest of any goalkeeper playing in one of Europe's five major leagues. Buffon was included in the 2011–12 Serie A Team of the Year for his performances. Juventus also made the Coppa Italia final that season, although Buffon did not play in this competition.

On 11 August 2012, Buffon lifted his first trophy as the new Juventus captain, following Alessandro Del Piero's departure as Juventus defeated Napoli 4–2 in extra time in the 2012 Supercoppa Italiana in Beijing. Buffon suffered a minor injury and missed the first Serie A match of the 2012–13 season against Parma on 25 August 2012. He returned to the starting line-up for the next match against Udinese in Udine on 2 September, wearing the captain's armband; Juventus won the match 4–1. On 20 September, in Juventus' first Champions League match of the season against defending champions Chelsea, Buffon made his 400th appearance for Juventus; the match ended in a 2–2 away draw. Buffon obtained his first clean sheet of the season in a 2–0 home win against Chievo on 22 September.

Buffon was nominated for the 2012 FIFA Ballon d'Or and the 2012 UEFA Team of the Year following his performances throughout the calendar year. He obtained his first Champions League clean sheet, against Nordsjælland, on 7 November, a match which Juve won 4–0 at Juventus Stadium. He also kept clean sheets as Juventus beat defending champions Chelsea 3–0 at home, and Shakhtar Donetsk 1–0 away from home, on Buffon's 100th club appearance in European competitions. Juventus topped their group undefeated, and advanced to the knockout stages for first time since 2008–09.

Buffon kept a clean sheet in a 1–0 Coppa Italia win against Cagliari on 12 December, allowing Juventus to progress to the quarter-finals of the tournament. On 16 December, Juventus defeated Atalanta 3–0, allowing Juventus to once again claim the unofficial title of "Serie A Winter Champions", with the best defence in Serie A, having only conceded ten goals in 17 matches. This was also Buffon's 20th clean sheet in 2012, the most of any other goalkeeper in Europe. Buffon was voted second in the IFFHS World's Best Goalkeeper award, behind Iker Casillas, and was named as goalkeeper of the century by the same organisation.
On 23 January 2013, Buffon signed a contract extension with Juventus, keeping him at the club until 2015. On 27 January 2013, Buffon was awarded the Serie A Goalkeeper of the Year award for the eighth time in his career. Juventus retained their Serie A title that season, and finished the league with the best defence, as Buffon conceded just 19 goals. The league victory allowed Buffon to lift the Serie A trophy as captain for the first time. Juventus were eliminated in the semi-finals of the Coppa Italia to winners Lazio, and in the quarter-finals of the Champions League to winners Bayern Munich.

On 18 August 2013, Juventus began the 2013–14 season by defending their Supercoppa Italiana title, at the Stadio Olimpico in Rome. Juventus defeated Lazio 4–0, with Buffon keeping a clean sheet in the competition for the first time; Buffon was praised for making several saves. On 24 November, Buffon made his 500th appearance in Serie A, keeping a clean sheet in a 2–0 away win against Livorno. On 6 December, Buffon recorded his seventh consecutive clean sheet, and his ninth of the season; as a result, he bettered his previous personal record of 568 minutes without conceding a goal in Serie A, going 640 minutes without being beaten in the Italian League. Buffon was finally beaten by Maximiliano Moralez in a 4–1 win over Atalanta, after going 745 minutes without conceding a goal in Serie A, and equalling Luca Marchegiani's sixth-best unbeaten streak in Serie A history. Buffon was nominated for the 2013 FIFPro XI and the 2013 Ballon d'Or for his performances throughout the calendar year.

In 2013, Buffon was once again named the second best goalkeeper in the world by IFFHS, behind Manuel Neuer. His performances earned him the Juventus player of the month award for December 2013. On 16 March 2014, Buffon saved the 20th penalty of his career in a 1–0 away win over Genoa, equalising Dino Zoff's 476 appearances for Juventus as the club's fifth all-time appearance holder. Buffon lifted the Serie A title for the third consecutive year, captaining the team to their 30th league title.

During the 2013–14 season, Juventus managed an Italian-record of 102 points, including a Serie A record of 33 victories; Juventus finished with the best defence of the league, yet again. Buffon managed 89 saves and 18 clean sheets in 33 appearances during the Serie A season, and conceded 19 goals. Juventus were eliminated in the group stage of the Champions League, although they later managed to reach the semi-finals of the Europa League, losing to Benfica. Buffon was chosen as part of the 2013–14 Europa League Team of the Season for his performances throughout the tournament. On 1 July 2014, Buffon signed a contract extension that would keep him at the club until 2017.

2014–15: Second Champions League Final and first Coppa Italia with Juventus 

In the summer of 2014, manager Antonio Conte left Juventus to take charge of the Italy national team, with former Milan manager Massimiliano Allegri called in as his replacement. Juve opened the 2014–15 season with a 1–0 away win over Chievo, with Buffon keeping a clean sheet and saving from Maxi López in the second half. On 27 September, Buffon saved a Germán Denis penalty in a 3–0 away win over Atalanta, helping Juventus to keep their fifth consecutive clean sheet in Serie A. He was eventually beaten by a Francesco Totti penalty in a 3–2 home win over Roma on 5 October after going unbeaten for 616 minutes that season. Including the previous season, Buffon managed to go 801 minutes in total without conceding a league goal; at the time, this record had only been bettered by Dino Zoff and Sebastiano Rossi. On 29 October, Buffon made his 500th appearance for Juventus in a 1–0 away loss to Genoa. On 1 November 2014, Buffon made his 400th League appearance with Juventus (37 of which were in Serie B, and 363 of which were in Serie A), keeping a clean sheet in a 2–0 away win over Empoli. On 24 November, Buffon was nominated for the 2014 FIFPro World XI for a record tenth time. He is currently the only goalkeeper to have been nominated for the award every year since its inception in 2005. The same week, Buffon was also nominated for the UEFA Team of the Year.

On 15 December 2014, Buffon was named Serie A Goalkeeper of the Year for the ninth time in his career, and was elected to the 2014 Serie A Team of the Year. On 22 December, Juventus were defeated by Napoli in the 2014 Supercoppa Italiana 8–7 on penalties, following a 2–2 draw after extra time. Although Buffon made several saves during the match, and managed to stop three penalties in the shoot-out, he was unable to prevent his team from losing the title. Buffon placed fourth in the 2014 IFFHS World's Best Goalkeeper Award, behind Manuel Neuer, Thibaut Courtois and Keylor Navas; this was the 15th consecutive year in which he had been named as one of the world's top five goalkeepers. On 15 February 2015, Buffon surpassed Gaetano Scirea as the Juventus player with the second most minutes played in Serie A, behind only Giampiero Boniperti. On 2 March 2015, Buffon equalled Scirea as the Juventus player with the third most appearances in Serie A, behind only Boniperti and Del Piero. He later surpassed Scirea on 14 March, making his 378th Serie A appearance with Juventus in a 1–0 away win over Palermo. After keeping a clean sheet in the second leg of the Champions League quarter-final against Monaco on 22 April, Buffon overtook Dida as the goalkeeper with the fourth-highest number of clean sheets in Champions League history, with 36. On 26 April, Buffon made his 528th appearance for Juventus in all competitions, equalling Giuseppe Furino as the player with third-most appearances for the club; he overtook Furino on 29 April. On 2 May, Buffon kept a clean sheet in a 1–0 away win over Sampdoria, as Juventus won their fourth consecutive Serie A title. On 13 May, Buffon produced a man of the match performance as Juventus drew 1–1 with Real Madrid at the Santiago Bernabéu Stadium in the second leg of the UEFA Champions League semi-final, only being beaten by a Cristiano Ronaldo penalty; the result allowed Buffon to progress to his second career Champions League final with Juventus, 12 years after his last appearance. On 20 May, he won his first Coppa Italia title with Juventus, despite not featuring throughout the tournament that season. On 23 May, in his 900th career appearance, Buffon saved a Lorenzo Insigne penalty in a 3–1 home win over Napoli in Serie A.
Buffon captained Juventus in the 2015 Champions League final as the Turin club were defeated 3–1 by Barcelona at Berlin's Olympiastadion. Buffon made the most saves throughout the tournament (39), and kept the most clean sheets (6), along with Danijel Subašić, Manuel Neuer and Marc-André ter Stegen. He was named to the 2014–15 UEFA Champions League Team of the Season for his performances throughout the tournament.

On 15 July 2015, Buffon was named to the ten-man shortlist for the 2015 UEFA Best Player in Europe Award. His save on Dani Alves in the Champions League final was also nominated for the UEFA Save of the Season Award, finishing on a tied third-place in the voting.

2015–16: Fifth consecutive Scudetto and record Serie A unbeaten streak 
On 8 August, Buffon kept a clean sheet as Juventus defeated Lazio 2–0 in the 2015 Supercoppa Italiana to win the title for a record seventh time. This was also Buffon's record sixth title, and his fifth with Juventus. On 12 August, it was announced that he placed fourth in the 2015 UEFA Best Player in Europe Award. Buffon was named the first Juventus Player of the Month of the 2015–16 season for September by fans after a series of consistent performances. On 21 October 2015, Buffon overtook Alessandro Del Piero's record for most minutes played with Juventus in the 73rd minute of Juventus' 0–0 home draw against Borussia Mönchengladbach, in the Champions League group stage. In the return group fixture against Borussia Mönchengladbach on 3 November, he made his 100th Champions League appearance, which ended in a 1–1 draw. On 21 November, he made his 552nd appearance for Juventus in a 1–0 home win over Milan, equalling Scirea as the club's second-highest appearance holder in all competitions, behind only Alessandro Del Piero. The following week, Buffon was nominated for the 2015 UEFA Team of the Year, also making his 100th appearance for Juventus in European Club Competitions in a 1–0 home win over Manchester City on 25 November. The following day, Buffon was included in the 55-player shortlist for the 2015 FIFPro World XI, despite having previously been omitted from the list of candidates for the 2015 FIFA Ballon d'Or. On 4 December 2015, Buffon made his 400th Serie A appearance with Juventus in a 2–0 away win over Lazio. For his performances throughout the previous season, Buffon was named Serie A Goalkeeper of the Year for the tenth time in his career on 14 December, and subsequently to the 2015 Serie A Team of the Year. Later that month, he was named one of the three finalists for the Globe Soccer Player of the Year Award. On 6 January 2016, he placed second in the 2015 IFFHS World's Best Goalkeeper Award, once again behind Manuel Neuer.

On 28 February 2016, Buffon kept his eighth consecutive clean sheet in Serie A in a 2–0 win over Inter. In the process, he set a new personal best in the top flight, and the outright sixth-best unbeaten streak in the history of the Italian league, after going 746 minutes without conceding a goal in Serie A, overtaking Morgan De Sanctis and Marchegiani. In the following league match against Atalanta on 6 March, he extended his unbeaten record by keeping another clean sheet in a 2–0 away win, also equalling Dino Zoff's and Sebastiano Rossi's league record of nine consecutive clean sheets in Serie A. His unbeaten streak of 836 minutes without conceding a goal was the third best unbeaten streak in Serie A history, behind only Zoff and Rossi, and was also the longest period a goalkeeper has gone without conceding a goal since three points for a win were introduced in Serie A during the 1994–95 season. He overtook Zoff in a 1–0 home victory over Sassuolo on 11 March, achieving a league record 10 consecutive clean sheets, and extended his unbeaten streak to 926 minutes without conceding a goal, only three minutes behind the all-time record holder, Rossi; the last time he had conceded a goal was when he was beaten by Antonio Cassano, in the 64th minute of a 2–1 away win over Sampdoria, on 10 January 2016. Buffon surpassed Rossi's record of 929 minutes by 45 minutes in a 4–1 away win over inter-city rivals Torino on 20 March, also surpassing Gianpiero Combi's Italian league record unbeaten streak of 934 minutes in the process; he set the new all-time record at 974 consecutive minutes without conceding a goal. Andrea Belotti finally ended his goalless streak by beating him from the penalty spot in the 48th minute of the same match.

On 24 April, Buffon saved a late penalty from Nikola Kalinić to secure a 2–1 away victory over Fiorentina, his 13th penalty save in Serie A; following Napoli's defeat against Roma the following day, Juventus clinched their record fifth consecutive Serie A title with three games at hand. In addition to his decisive saves and record breaking unbeaten streak, Buffon was praised for his leadership, and his role in motivating the team following their defeat against Sassuolo on 28 October 2015, as Juventus subsequently went on a 25-match unbeaten streak to come back from 12th place after ten matches to win the title. For his key performances in helping Juventus capture the league title, Buffon was named the Juventus Player of the Month for April 2016. On 11 May, Buffon extended his contract until the end of the 2017–18 season. Throughout the 2015–16 season, Buffon had managed to equal his personal best of 21 clean sheets in a single league season, and was voted Juventus' Player of the Season.

On 18 July, Buffon was included in the ten-man shortlist for the 2016 UEFA Best Player in Europe Award, in which he finished sixth.

2016–17: Record sixth straight Scudetto and third Champions League Final 

On 11 October 2016, Buffon became the first goalkeeper ever to win the Golden Foot Award. Following his performances throughout the year, Buffon was included in the 30-man shortlist for the 2016 Ballon d'Or; he placed ninth alongside Pepe in the final ranking. In Juventus' fourth Champions League group match of the season on 2 November, a 1–1 home draw against Lyon, Buffon made his 100th Champions League appearance (excluding appearances in qualifying rounds), becoming the 29th player to reach this landmark. On 4 November, he was included in the 23-player shortlist for The 2016 Best FIFA Men's Player Award. On 6 November, Buffon earned his 600th Serie A appearance in a 2–1 away win against Chievo, the fourth player to reach this milestone. His performances saw him earn the Juventus Player of the Month Award for October 2016. On 21 November, Buffon was nominated for the UEFA Team of the Year for the ninth time his career, making him goalkeeper with the most nominations ever, alongside Iker Casillas. On 1 December, Buffon was nominated for the 2016 FIFPro World XI, making him the only player, alongside Cristiano Ronaldo, to have been included in the shortlist every year since its inception in 2005. On 23 December, Buffon made his 600th competitive appearance for Juventus in the 2016 Supercoppa Italiana; following a 1–1 draw after extra time, Juventus lost 4–3 to Milan in a penalty shoot-out, although Buffon saved Gianluca Lapadula's initial spot kick. Buffon capped off the year by placing second in the 2016 IFFHS World's Best Goalkeeper Award, finishing behind Neuer once again.

On 5 January 2017, Buffon was named to the 2016 UEFA Team of the Year, becoming the oldest player ever to be named to the UEFA Team of the Year; this was also the fourth time he had been voted to the UEFA Team of the Year. On 9 January, it was announced Buffon had placed eighth in The 2016 Best FIFA Men's Player Award. On 30 January, Buffon was voted Serie A Goalkeeper of the Year for the 11th time, and named to the 2016 Serie A Team of the Year. On 17 February, Buffon made his 443rd Serie A appearance for Juventus in a 4–1 home win over Palermo, equalling Giampiero Boniperti as the club's all-time second highest appearance holder in the competition, behind only Del Piero. On 22 February, he made his 100th Champions League appearance for Juventus in the first leg of the club's round of 16 tie against Porto, keeping a clean sheet in the 2–0 away win. On 5 March, Buffon drew level with Totti as the joint third-highest appearance holder in Serie A after making his 612th appearance in the competition in a 1–1 away draw against Udinese. On 19 March, Buffon surpassed Boniperti as the all-time minute holder for a Juventus player in Serie A in the 66th minute of a 1–0 away win over Sampdoria. On 2 April, he equalled Javier Zanetti as the joint-second highest appearance holder of all time in Serie A, with his 615th Serie A appearance in a 1–1 away draw against Napoli. On 3 May, Buffon made his 100th appearance for Juventus in the UEFA Champions League (excluding appearances in the qualifying rounds) in a 2–0 away win against Monaco, in the first leg of the semi-finals of the competition; Buffon became only the second Italian player after Paolo Maldini to make 100 Champions League appearances for a single club, and marked the occasion with a clean sheet, his 47th overall in the competition, making him the goalkeeper with the third-highest number of Champions League clean sheets, alongside Čech, and behind only Casillas (57) and Van der Sar (50). This was the first time Juventus had managed to keep six consecutive clean sheets in a single edition of the tournament, the joint third-best number of consecutive clean sheets in a single Champions League season. On 9 May, Buffon made his 150th UEFA club appearance in a 2–1 home win over Monaco in the second leg of the Champions League semi-final, making him the player with the ninth-most appearances in UEFA club matches, alongside Jamie Carragher. Juventus' 4–1 win on aggregate saw Buffon reach the third Champions League final of his career; Kylian Mbappé's second-half goal ended Buffon's goalless streak, which saw him set a new personal best of 600 minutes without conceding a goal in the Champions League, and put him fifth on the all-time table, while Juventus' overall unbeaten run of 690 minutes was the second-longest in the history of the competition.

On 17 May 2017, Juventus won their 12th Coppa Italia title in a 2–0 win over Lazio, becoming the first team to win three consecutive cups. Buffon did not feature, as his usual back-up Neto was the club's starting goalkeeper in the competition. Four days later on 21 May, following a 3–0 win over Crotone, Juventus secured their sixth consecutive Serie A title, establishing an all-time record of successive triumphs in the competition; with his eighth Serie A title, Buffon equalled Virginio Rosetta, Giovanni Ferrari, and Giuseppe Furino as the player with the most Italian league title victories. On 3 June 2017, Juventus entered a second Champions League Final in three years, and the third final for Buffon, but were defeated 4–1 by defending champions Real Madrid. With his third Champions League final defeat, Buffon became the player with the most Champions League final appearances without a Champions League medal, alongside former Juventus teammates Paolo Montero and Alessio Tacchinardi. He was named in the UEFA Champions League squad of the season for the second time, and the tournament's best goalkeeper.

2017–2018: Final season of first spell with Juventus and seventh consecutive Scudetto 
On 12 June 2017, Buffon announced that the 2017–18 season would likely be his last with the club. On 4 August, Buffon was named one of the three finalists for the Goalkeeper of the 2016–17 UEFA Champions League season award, along with Manuel Neuer and Jan Oblak. On 15 August, Buffon was also listed as one of the three finalists for the 2017 UEFA Best Player of the Year Award, along with Lionel Messi and Cristiano Ronaldo. On 19 August, Buffon made history by saving the first Serie A penalty awarded via VAR in a 3–0 home win over Cagliari in the club's opening league match of the season. On 24 August, he was named the best goalkeeper of the 2016–17 Champions League season, He also placed third in the UEFA Men's Player of the Year Award, with 109 votes. On 23 October, Buffon won the inaugural 2017 Best FIFA Goalkeeper award, and was named to the FIFPro World XI for the third time in his career; he was also nominated for the 2017 Best FIFA Men's Player Award, finishing in fourth place in the voting. On 27 November, Buffon won the Serie A Footballer of the Year award, the first time a goalkeeper has won the award, along with the Serie A Goalkeeper of the Year award for the twelfth time, while being named to the Serie A Team of the Year for the fifth time in his career. On 3 December, he equalled Casillas by winning the IFFHS World's Best Goalkeeper Award for a record fifth time, and on 7 December, he placed fourth in the 2017 Ballon d'Or. Following Juventus' 1–0 away victory against fellow title contenders Napoli on 1 December, Buffon was ruled out of Juventus' final Champions League group match against Olympiacos four days later, after picking up a calf strain in the previous match, an injury which kept him sidelined for almost two months; was replaced by his deputy Wojciech Szczęsny in goal during his absence.

On 11 January 2018, Buffon was named to the 2017 UEFA Team of the Year for the fifth time. Buffon returned to action on 30 January 2018, two days after his 40th birthday, keeping a clean sheet and saving a penalty from Alejandro Gómez to secure a 1–0 away win over Atalanta in the first leg of the Coppa Italia semi-finals; this was his first Coppa Italia appearance in over five years, while his penalty save was the 30th of his career, excluding those made in shoot-outs, and his first ever in regulation time in the competition. He made his 500th league appearance with Juventus — including both Serie A and Serie B matches — on 9 February, in a 2–0 away win over Fiorentina. After Juventus lost 3–0 to Real Madrid at home in the first leg of the Champions League quarter-final on 3 April, Buffon helped Juventus keep a 3–0 away lead in the second leg on 11 April, until the 93rd minute when he was sent off for dissent after a confrontation with referee Michael Oliver who awarded an injury time penalty to Real Madrid; Szczęsny was forced to be substituted in, with the resulting penalty kick converted by Cristiano Ronaldo for a final 4–3 aggregate loss. On 9 May, Buffon kept a clean sheet, his 300th clean sheet with Juventus, and his 383rd at club level, in a 4–0 win over Milan in the 2018 Coppa Italia Final; this was Juventus' fourth consecutive Coppa Italia title. On 11 May, Buffon was charged by UEFA over post-match comments made about referee Oliver. On 13 May, Buffon won his record seventh straight Scudetto, following a 0–0 draw with Roma in Juventus' penultimate match of the season while an unused substitute; with this league victory, he became the first player ever to win nine Serie A titles. On 17 May, with one league match still left, Buffon announced in a press conference that he would leave Juventus at the end of the season. On 19 May, after 17 seasons with the club, Buffon played his 656th and final match with Juventus, the last match of the season at home against Hellas Verona. He started in goal, and was later substituted in the 64th minute by debutant Carlo Pinsoglio as he received a standing ovation with the score 2–0 in favour of Juventus; the match later ended in a 2–1 victory. On 5 June, the UEFA Control, Ethics and Disciplinary Body gave Buffon a three-match ban for UEFA competition matches "for which he would be otherwise eligible", after his post-match comments about referee Oliver in the season's Champions League quarter-final against Real Madrid. On 30 June, the final day of his Juventus contract, Buffon bid the club farewell with a post on Twitter:

Paris Saint-Germain 

On 6 July 2018, Buffon signed a one-year contract, with the option for a second year, with Paris Saint-Germain. He made his competitive debut for PSG on 4 August, keeping a clean sheet in a 4–0 win against Monaco in the 2018 Trophée des Champions. Buffon made his Ligue 1 debut on 12 August, keeping a clean sheet in a 3–0 home win over Caen. He was used in a rotational role with Alphonse Areola during the 2018–19 season by manager Thomas Tuchel. After serving a three-match ban in UEFA club competitions, Buffon started for PSG in a 1–1 away draw against Napoli on 6 November, and was beaten by an Insigne penalty; at the age of 40 years and 282 days, he became the second-oldest player ever to make their Champions League debut for a club after Mark Schwarzer, who made his debut in the competition with Chelsea in a 1–0 home victory over Steaua București on 11 December 2013, aged 41 years and 65 days. On 18 December, following an injury to Areola, Buffon played the second half of an eventual 2–1 away win over Orléans in the round of 16 of the Coupe de la Ligue. PSG were eliminated from the competition in the following round after a surprise 2–1 home defeat to Guingamp on 9 January 2019, during which Buffon remained on the bench.

On 12 February, Buffon kept his 50th Champions League clean sheet in a 2–0 away win over Manchester United, becoming only the third goalkeeper to reach this milestone after Iker Casillas (57) and Edwin van der Sar (51). He also made his 121st Champions League appearance – excluding qualifying rounds – during the same match, which made him the player with the tenth-most appearances of all time in the competition. In the return leg in Paris on 6 March, Buffon came under criticism in the media for committing an error with the score tied 1–1, after he spilled Marcus Rashford's long-range shot, thus allowing Romelu Lukaku to score from the rebound and send United into the lead; following an injury-time goal from a penalty by Rashford, Manchester United completed a comeback to win the match 3–1, advancing to the Champions League quarter-finals on away goals. PSG finished the season as Ligue 1 champions, which saw Buffon win his tenth league title of his career, the most of any Italian player. PSG later lost 6–5 on penalties to Rennes in the 2019 Coupe de France Final, following a 2–2 draw after extra time, although Buffon did not appear during the final.

On 5 June, it was confirmed that he was leaving the club after one season.

Return to Juventus

2019–2021: record-breaking appearances 

On 4 July 2019, after a season away from Juventus, Buffon signed a one-year contract with the club. Upon arrival, he was offered the number 1 shirt by Wojciech Szczęsny and the captaincy by Giorgio Chiellini, but he turned them down, saying "I didn't come back to take something from someone or take it back...I just want to do my bit for the team". Instead, he chose to wear number 77; the same number he had worn during his final season at Parma, before joining Juventus in 2001. He made his first appearance since his return to the club on 21 September, in a 2–1 home win over Verona in Serie A; this was his 902nd career club appearance, which equalled Paolo Maldini's record as the Italian player with the most career club appearances. On 28 September, he overtook Maldini with his 903rd appearance in a 2–0 home win over SPAL in Serie A.

On 30 October 2019, Buffon made his 513th league appearance for Juventus (including Serie B matches) in a 2–1 home win over Genoa in Serie A, equalling Del Piero as the player with the most league appearances for the club. On 11 December, he kept his 51st Champions League clean sheet (excluding those in the qualifying rounds) in a 2–0 away win over Bayer Leverkusen in Juventus' final group match of the campaign, equalling Van der Sar as the goalkeeper with the second-most clean sheets ever in the competition, behind only Iker Casillas. On 15 December, he made his 700th Italian league appearance in a 3–1 home win over Udinese; during the same match, he also made his 478th Serie A appearance for Juventus, which saw him equal Del Piero as the player with the most appearances in the competition for the club. On 18 December, in a 2–1 away win over Sampdoria, Buffon made his 479th Serie A appearance for Juventus, surpassing Del Piero's appearance record for the club in the Italian top flight, as well as making his 647th overall Serie A appearance, tying Maldini as the player with the most appearances in the competition.

On 13 February 2020, Buffon made nine saves in a 1–1 away draw against Milan in the first leg of the Coppa Italia semi-finals. He started in the final against Napoli on 17 June, keeping a clean sheet and making a series of injury-time saves to keep the score tied at 0–0; however, Juventus suffered a 4–2 defeat in the resulting penalty shoot-out, with Buffon unable to save any spot kicks. On 29 June, Buffon signed a new contract with Juventus, extending until June 2021. On 4 July, he made his 648th appearance in Serie A in a 4–1 home win over rivals Torino, overtaking Maldini as the most capped player of all time in the competition, also becoming the most capped player in Europe's top five leagues with 665 appearances, including his 17 Ligue 1 appearances for Paris Saint-Germain during the 2018–19 season.

On 17 October, Buffon made his first appearance of the 2020–21 season, starting in a 1–1 away draw against Crotone. On 8 December, Buffon kept a clean sheet by saving seven shots, all of them taken by Messi, in a 3–0 away win over Barcelona in Juventus' final group match of the campaign. Buffon became the first goalkeeper to ever record a Champions League clean sheet in four different decades. Messi's seven shots on target were also the most recorded without scoring in the Champions League since the 2002–03 edition. On 11 May 2021, Buffon announced that he would leave Juventus at the end of the season. On 19 May, he started in Juventus's 2–1 victory over Atalanta in the 2021 Coppa Italia Final, his final and 685th appearance for the club; after the match, he was given the honour of lifting the title, the sixth of his career, equalling Roberto Mancini as the player with the most title victories.

Return to Parma 
On 17 June 2021, after days of speculation following his departure from Juventus, newly-relegated Parma announced the return of Buffon through a short video posted on the club's official Twitter account. Upon winning the Coppa Italia in his last season at Juventus, many expected that it was going to be the end of his career. Instead, he announced that he was going to join his boyhood club and this marked 20 years since he left Parma for Juventus in 2001. On 20 August 2021, Buffon made his first appearance, conceding a late equaliser in a 2–2 away draw against Frosinone.

On 5 February 2022, following a 0–0 away draw against Benevento in Serie B, Buffon became the first goalkeeper ever in men's association football to keep 500 clean sheets (322 with Juventus, 92 with Parma, nine with PSG and 77 with Italy). On 28 February, Parma announced Buffon's contract extension until 2024, which will keep him playing until the age of 46.

International career

Youth career, early call-ups and Euro 2000 qualification 

Buffon has represented Italy at all youth levels, from the under-16 side to the under-23 side, as well as the Olympic side in 1996. With the Italy under-16 side, he reached the final of the 1993 UEFA European Under-16 Championship, saving two penalties and even scoring one himself in the quarter-final shootout victory over Spain, and subsequently saving three penalties – but also missing one himself – in the semi-final shootout victory over Czechoslovakia. With the Italy U-17 side he took part at the 1993 FIFA U-17 World Championship in Japan. In 1995, he reached the final of the UEFA European Under-19 Championship with the Italian U-19 side. He was most notably a member of Italy's 1996 UEFA European Under-21 Championship-winning squad. Buffon was a member of the Italy squad that won the gold medal for football at the 1997 Mediterranean Games in Bari, on home soil. Buffon currently holds the record for the most clean sheets with the Italian national side.

Buffon was awarded his first cap for Italy's senior team under Cesare Maldini on 29 October 1997, at the age of 19 years and 9 months, as an injury replacement for Gianluca Pagliuca during the first leg of the 1998 World Cup qualification play-off against Russia, in Moscow; with this cap, Buffon became the youngest goalkeeper to feature for Italy post-World War II. This record was beaten by Gianluigi Donnarumma on 1 September 2016. Buffon came on in the 31st minute and made notable saves under snowy conditions in a 1–1 away draw, including an important stop from a Dmitri Alenichev shot, only being beaten by a Fabio Cannavaro own goal. The result helped Italy to qualify for the upcoming World Cup 2–1 on aggregate. He was a member of the squad for the 1998 World Cup finals, initially as the third choice goalkeeper; after an injury to starting goalkeeper Angelo Peruzzi, Buffon was promoted to second-choice goalkeeper behind Pagliuca, with Francesco Toldo being called up as third-choice, but Buffon did not play a single game in the tournament. Italy were eliminated in the quarter-finals on penalties to hosts and eventual 1998 World Cup champions France.

Buffon became the first choice goalkeeper during the Euro 2000 qualifying campaign and was due to start in goal during the finals under manager and former Italy goalkeeping legend Dino Zoff, but he broke his hand while attempting to stop John Carew's goal in a 1–0 defeat against Norway in a warm up game just a few days before Italy's opening match of the tournament against Turkey. His starting place was taken by backup goalkeeper Francesco Toldo, and Christian Abbiati was called up as a replacement third keeper, with Francesco Antonioli being promoted to second goalkeeper. Italy reached the final of the tournament, losing once again to France.

World Cup and European Championship debut 
Francesco Toldo's impressive performances at Euro 2000 meant that he retained his place in the first team for the beginning of Italy's 2002 World Cup qualifying campaign. In spite of heavy competition from Toldo, Buffon regained the starting goalkeeping spot for the fourth match of the qualification series, away to Romania, and was the starting goalkeeper for the remaining four matches under Giovanni Trapattoni as Italy qualified with an unbeaten record.

Buffon played every minute of Italy's 2002 World Cup campaign, keeping a clean sheet in the opening match against Ecuador, and saving a controversial penalty against co-hosts South Korea in the round of 16, which was not enough to stop the under-performing side from being eliminated by a golden goal in extra time. He also featured in every match at Euro 2004, keeping a clean sheet in his nation's opening 0–0 draw against Denmark, although Italy, despite not losing a match, once again underperformed, and were eliminated in the first round on direct encounters following a three-way, five-point tie with Sweden and Denmark.

2006 World Cup champion 

Buffon was once again the first choice goalkeeper under his former Juventus coach and Trapattoni's replacement Marcello Lippi, as Italy finished first in their 2006 World Cup qualifying group. Although his place in Italy's 2006 World Cup was initially in doubt, as he was being investigated for possible involvement in the 2006 Calciopoli scandal, he was later named by Lippi as Italy's starting goalkeeper for the tournament.

During the 2006 World Cup finals, Buffon was in excellent form, setting a World Cup record by conceding just two goals in seven matches, and keeping five clean sheets. In addition, he posted a 453-minute scoreless streak, only 64 minutes short of compatriot Walter Zenga's all-time unbeaten record from the 1990 World Cup. The only goals he conceded were not in open play; an own goal by teammate Cristian Zaccardo after a free-kick against the United States in Italy's second match of the group stage, and a Zinedine Zidane penalty in the final against France. In the final, Buffon later made an important save in extra time on a header from eventual Golden Ball winner Zidane, which Buffon later described as the most important save of his career. The match ended 1–1 after extra time and was followed by a penalty shootout in which neither Buffon nor Fabien Barthez saved a spot kick. The lone miss was David Trezeguet's effort which hit the bottom of the crossbar and failed to cross the line, enabling Italy's Fabio Grosso to seal the victory for Italy. Buffon was named Man of the Match in Italy's 1–0 victory over Australia in the round of 16, and later also received the Yashin Award as the best goalkeeper of the tournament, producing 40 saves, and was elected to the Team of the Tournament. Buffon also finished second to compatriot Fabio Cannavaro in the 2006 Ballon d'Or and eighth in the FIFA World Player of the Year for his performances that season, and was named in the 2006 FIFPro World XI and the 2006 UEFA Team of the Year. In 2013, Nick Miller of ESPN FC named Buffon's save against Lukas Podolski in Italy's 2–0 victory against hosts Germany in the semi-finals as one of the greatest in World Cup history, placing it at number nine in his list of "World Cup's greatest ever saves". In 2019, Diario AS placed the latter save at number eight in their collection of "The 10 greatest saves of all time".

Post-World Cup victory 
Buffon wore the captain's armband for Italy for the first time under manager Roberto Donadoni, in a 2–0 home win over Georgia in a Euro 2008 qualifier, due to the suspension of regular skipper Fabio Cannavaro. He was later named Italy's second acting captain for Euro 2008 after incumbent Cannavaro was ruled out of the tournament due to injury, and as Italy's replacement captain Alessandro Del Piero was frequently deployed as a substitute. He made his first appearance as Italy's captain in the nation's opening fixture of Euro 2008 on 9 June, a 3–0 defeat to the Netherlands. In the second game of the group stage against Romania on 13 June, he saved an 81st-minute penalty from Adrian Mutu to keep Italy's hopes alive following their opening defeat, as the match ended 1–1. Buffon kept a clean sheet against France in the final group game, and garnered praise in the media for a notable save against Karim Benzema, as Italy won 2–0 to advance to the quarter-finals. Italy were eliminated nine days later, when a 0–0 draw after extra time led to a 4–2 penalty shootout loss to eventual champions Spain; Buffon saved one penalty in the shootout and was elected to the Team of the Tournament for his performances.

Upon Marcello Lippi's return, Buffon was confirmed as the starting goalkeeper. He played all three group matches during Italy's disappointing 2009 FIFA Confederations Cup campaign in South Africa, in which they finished third in their group in three-way three-point tie. He earned his 100th cap on 14 November 2009 in a friendly match against the Netherlands. He was a key player in Italy's World Cup qualifying campaign as they finished top of their group, undefeated.

In the 2010 World Cup, Buffon was replaced at half-time in Italy's 1–1 draw in their opening group stage match against Paraguay after he had a problem with his sciatic nerve. He did not play again in the tournament and was substituted by Federico Marchetti. Reigning champions Italy disappointed and failed to win a match, finishing last in their group with just two points earned. Lippi was dismissed after Italy's premature elimination from the World Cup.

Italy captain and Euro 2012 runner-up 

After the international retirement of Fabio Cannavaro, Buffon became the new captain of the national team under new manager Cesare Prandelli. On 9 February 2011, after recovering from a back injury, Buffon played his first game as Italy's official captain in a 1–1 friendly draw against Germany in Dortmund. On 6 September 2011, after a 1–0 Italy win over Slovenia, Buffon surpassed Dino Zoff and established the new record for most minutes without conceding a goal in European Championship qualifying matches, going 644 minutes without conceding a goal; the win also allowed Italy to qualify for Euro 2012. On 11 October, prior to Italy's 3–0 win in a European qualifier against Northern Ireland, Buffon received a commemorative cap and medal from UEFA to mark his 100th international appearance; regarding his achievement, he commented: "I feel I'm entering the football nobility today and I'm happy to celebrate this milestone while still playing". On 15 November 2011, in a friendly match against Uruguay, Buffon surpassed Zoff's number of caps for Italy (112), putting him behind only the retired former Italian captains Cannavaro and Paolo Maldini; he overtook Zoff in Italy's next friendly match against the United States on 29 February 2012. He was subsequently selected as Italy's starting goalkeeper and captain for Euro 2012 after leading his national side to qualify for the tournament undefeated, only conceding two goals.

At Euro 2012, Buffon acted as captain during the entire tournament. He kept a clean sheet against the Republic of Ireland in the third group stage match and against England, saving a crucial penalty from Ashley Cole in the quarter-final shootout, in which he was elected man of the match. In the semi-final match against Germany, Buffon made several important saves, only being beaten by a penalty from Mesut Özil in the 92nd minute. Italy won the match 2–1 and advanced to the final against defending European and World champions Spain, with whom Italy had drawn 1–1 in the opening group stage match, only having conceded three goals; the semi-final victory qualified Italy for the 2013 Confederations Cup, as Spain had previously won the 2010 World Cup. Italy were beaten 4–0 in the final as Spain claimed a record third consecutive major trophy, and their second consecutive European Championship title. Buffon was once again elected to the Team of the Tournament for his performances.

2014 World Cup qualifying and 2013 Confederations Cup 
On 26 March 2013, in a 2014 World Cup qualifying match against Malta, Buffon earned his 126th cap for Italy, equalling Paolo Maldini's number of caps for the national team. In the same match, Buffon saved a penalty from Michael Mifsud, helping Italy to a 2–0 away win.

Buffon was included in the Italian squad for the 2013 Confederations Cup in Brazil and played in every match of the tournament as captain. On 16 June 2013, he featured in Italy's opening 2–1 win against Mexico, where he was beaten only by a Javier Hernández penalty. In the next game, on 19 June 2013 against Japan, the referee awarded Japan a penalty in the 20th minute of the first half when he declared that Shinji Okazaki had been brought down by Buffon after a misplaced back pass by Mattia De Sciglio; Buffon received a yellow card. The squad's eventual 4–3 win allowed Italy to progress to the semi-finals of the competition for the first time, where they were to face Spain in a rematch of the Euro 2012 final. After a 0–0 draw, they lost 7–6 in the resulting penalty shootout. Although both Buffon and Spanish counterpart Iker Casillas had managed to keep a clean sheet throughout the match, neither goalkeeper was able to stop a penalty in the shootout; the lone miss, by Leonardo Bonucci, was hit over bar. In the third-place match, Italy defeated Uruguay 3–2 in the penalty shootout after a 2–2 deadlock following extra time. Buffon saved three penalties; those taken by Diego Forlán, Juventus teammate Martín Cáceres and Walter Gargano.

On 6 September 2013, Buffon earned his 135th cap for Italy in the 2014 World Cup qualifier against Bulgaria. This cap put him at only one cap from record appearance holder Fabio Cannavaro. Buffon kept a clean sheet for Italy in the 1–0 win and was praised for making several saves, earning the man of the match award. The win allowed Italy to move seven points clear in their qualifying group. In the 2014 FIFA World Cup qualifying fixture against the Czech Republic, at Juventus Stadium in Turin on 10 September 2013, Buffon equalled Cannavaro as the Italian national team record appearance holder, with 136 caps. Italy won the match 2–1, allowing them to qualify for the 2014 World Cup in Brazil as top of their group, with two games at hand; this was the first time that the Italian squad had done so. On 11 October 2013, in a 2–2 World Cup qualifier draw against Denmark, Buffon surpassed Cannavaro, becoming the sole record appearance holder for Italy, with 137. On 2 January 2014, Buffon was awarded the 2013 Pallone Azzurro award, which is given to the Italian national side's best player of the year.

2014 World Cup 

On 12 May, Buffon was named in Italy's 31-man preliminary World Cup squad by Cesare Prandelli, and on 31 May, he was named the starting goalkeeper and captain in the final squad. Italy were placed in Group D, in the so-called "group of death", or "group of champions", with Costa Rica, England and Uruguay. Buffon became the third player to be part of five World Cup squads, tying the records held by Mexican goalkeeper Antonio Carbajal and German footballer Lothar Matthäus. Due to an ankle injury suffered in training, Buffon was not selected to start in Italy's first match of the World Cup against England on 14 June 2014; he was replaced by Salvatore Sirigu. Andrea Pirlo captained the team in his absence, as Italy won the match 2–1.

In Italy's next group match, which ended in a 1–0 loss to Costa Rica, he captained his national side for the first time at a World Cup, the fourth World Cup in which he appeared. In Italy's final group game against Uruguay, Buffon saved shots from Luis Suárez and Nicolás Lodeiro, as Italy were reduced to ten men following Claudio Marchisio's controversial red card. Buffon was eventually beaten in the 81st minute by a Diego Godín header, moments after Luis Suárez's bite on Giorgio Chiellini. Buffon was voted man of the match for his performance. Italy finished in third place in their group, and were eliminated in the group stage for a second consecutive World Cup.

Euro 2016 
Buffon made his first appearance for Italy under new manager Antonio Conte on 9 September 2014, captaining his team in their opening European Championship qualifying match against Norway in Oslo. He kept a clean sheet as Italy won the match 2–0. On 12 June 2015, Buffon became the first player to appear in 50 UEFA competitive international matches in Italy's 1–1 away draw against Croatia in a European qualifying match. Buffon saved an early Mario Mandžukić penalty, but was taken off at half time and replaced by Salvatore Sirigu due to an injury. He made his 150th appearance for Italy on 6 September 2015, keeping a clean sheet in a home 1–0 win over Bulgaria, his 62nd clean sheet at the international level. Italy qualified for Euro 2016 on 10 October in a 3–1 win over Azerbaijan.

After the Euro qualification, Buffon stated that Euro 2016 would be the final European Championship of his career, but expressed his intentions to retire only after the 2018 World Cup, which would see him play up to the age of 40. On 31 May 2016, Buffon was named the captain of Conte's 23-man Italy squad for Euro 2016. In Italy's first game of the tournament on 13 June, Buffon kept a clean sheet in a 2–0 victory over Belgium. This was Buffon's 14th appearance at the European Championships, making him Italy's out-right most capped player of all-time in the tournament, after overtaking Maldini, Del Piero and Cassano; with his fourth tournament appearance, he also equalled Del Piero for the most UEFA European Championships played in by an Italian player. He kept another clean sheet in a 1–0 win over Sweden in Italy's second group fixture on 17 June, which allowed his nation to top the group and advance to the second round, although he was later booked in injury time for time-wasting. Due to a bout of fever, Buffon was rested in Italy's final group match on 22 June, a 1–0 defeat against the Republic of Ireland, and was replaced by deputy Salvatore Sirigu. He returned to the starting line-up for his nation's round of 16 fixture against Spain on 27 June, making a crucial injury time save on Gerard Piqué to earn his third consecutive clean sheet of the tournament, as Italy avenged their Euro 2012 final defeat with a 2–0 victory over the defending champions. After a 1–1 draw following extra time in Italy's quarter-final fixture against Germany on 2 July, Buffon saved one penalty in the resulting shoot-out, although the reigning World Cup champions would ultimately emerge victorious following a 6–5 shoot-out loss. His one on one save to deny Mario Gómez in regulation time was later nominated for the UEFA Save of the Season Award. By the end of the following month, his nominated save on Gómez finished third with 14% of the votes.

2018 World Cup qualifying campaign, retirement and brief return 

On 6 October 2016, Buffon made his 164th appearance for Italy in a 1–1 draw against Spain in a 2018 World Cup qualifying match in Turin, under manager Gian Piero Ventura, making him the joint eighth-most capped international player of all time with Cobi Jones, and the second-most capped active international player, behind only Iker Casillas. On 15 November 2016, Buffon won his 167th Italy cap in their friendly 0–0 draw in Milan against Germany, equalling the European international appearance record jointly held by Iker Casillas and Vitālijs Astafjevs, and making him the most capped active international player in the world alongside Casillas. On 1 January 2017, Buffon was awarded the 2016 Pallone Azzurro Award, as Italy's best international player throughout the calendar year, becoming the first player to win the award more than once. On 24 March, Buffon made his 1,000th career appearance, keeping a clean sheet (his 426th overall for club and country) in a 2–0 home over Albania in a World Cup qualifier, becoming the eighteenth player to reach this milestone; in the process, he also became the sole most capped European player at international level, with his 168th appearance for Italy, and the joint fifth-most capped male international footballer of all time, alongside Iván Hurtado.

On 2 September, Buffon made his 170th international appearance in a 3–0 away defeat to Spain in a World Cup qualifier; he later extended his European international appearance record with his 172nd appearance for Italy on 6 October, in a 1–1 home draw against Macedonia in a 2018 World Cup qualifier, making him the fourth-most capped male international footballer of all time, ahead of Egyptian striker Hossam Hassan (169 caps), and behind only Egyptian midfielder Ahmed Hassan (184 caps), Saudi Arabian goalkeeper Mohamed Al-Deayea (178 caps), and Mexican defender Claudio Suárez (177 caps).

Buffon's 175th international appearance came on 13 November, in the second leg of the World Cup play-offs against Sweden, at the San Siro Stadium in Milan. Although he kept a clean sheet in the 0–0 draw, Italy's 1–0 away loss in the first leg on 10 November saw Sweden advance on aggregate, meaning that Italy had failed to qualify for the World Cup for the first time in 60 years. Although he had originally intended to retire after competing in the 2018 World Cup, following the match and Italy's failure to qualify the tournament, an emotional and tearful Buffon communicated his retirement from international football, stating: "I'm not sorry for myself but all of Italian football. We failed at something which also means something on a social level. There's regret at finishing like that, not because time passes. There is certainly a future for Italian football, as we have pride, ability, determination and after bad tumbles, we always find a way to get back on our feet."

He later confirmed his international retirement on social media, tweeting from the national team's official account: "We are proud, we are strong, we are stubborn. We will pick ourselves up as we have always done. I am leaving a national team set-up that will know how to pick itself up again. Best wishes to everybody, and especially to those with whom I have shared this beautiful journey." After winning the Serie A Footballer of the Year Award later that month, Buffon hinted that he could possibly play for Italy again, stating: "I took a break from the national team. I'm of a certain age, so it's right for me to take a pause. With the way I am though, both for Juventus and for the national team I have always considered myself a soldier, so I could never desert a possible call in the future if needed. Even at 60, if there were a total absence of goalkeepers and they asked me to come back, I'd be there, because I have in me the concept of nation."

On 17 March 2018, despite Buffon's initial decision to retire, he was called up for Italy's March friendlies against Argentina and England by caretaker manager Luigi Di Biagio. When asked why he had accepted a call-up after initially announcing his international retirement, he responded: "I'm a consistent person, who feels a great sense of responsibility, that alone is enough to explain my presence. In addition, I've always been an unifying element in the national set-up, and I'd like my presence to be seen in this way. The young lads will grow, some already have, and from tomorrow they'll get their chance," and "I am here for Astori [a former international teammate of Buffon's who had recently died from a heart attack] as well, it's another reason why I wanted to be here." On 23 March, Buffon started in goal for Italy for the 176th time, in a friendly against Argentina, and also surpassed Cannavaro to become the record appearance holder as Italy captain, with 80; Italy were defeated by Argentina 2–0. On 17 May 2018, Buffon announced in a press conference with Juventus that he would not return to the national team for its May and June friendlies.

Player profile

Style of play and reception 

Since his emergence as a precocious talent in his youth, Buffon has been renowned for his consistent performances throughout his career, and has received praise from managers, players, as well as both present and former goalkeeping colleagues, for his concentration and calm composure under pressure, as well as his work-rate, and longevity. Regarded as one of the best players ever in his position, he is often considered to be the archetype of the modern goalkeeper, and has been cited by many other subsequent goalkeepers as a major influence and role model. He has been described as "an agile, strong, and commanding shot-stopper, who is hugely experienced at the highest level" and "an accomplished and well respected keeper" with an "[e]xcellent positional sense, courage, power and class". Buffon has been praised for his athleticism, his "outstanding shot-stopping", his acrobatic dives, and his quick reflexes, as well as his ability to produce decisive saves, despite being a tall, large and physically imposing goalkeeper. Although he has at times been criticised for not being particularly adept at stopping penalties, he has also proven to be effective in this area, as demonstrated by his penalty-saving record; With 16 saves, he has stopped the joint-fifth–highest number of penalties in Serie A history, alongside Giuseppe Moro.

In his prime, Buffon was a talented, complete, brave, aggressive, and often instinctive and frenetic goalkeeper, who was recognised for his speed, prowess, and anticipation when coming off his line in one on one situations, as well as his confidence, goalkeeping technique, reactions, and ability to get to ground quickly to collect, parry, or even challenge for the ball with his feet; when playing in teams that relied upon high defensive lines and a zonal marking system, he often functioned as a sweeper-keeper, frequently rushing out of his area to clear the ball or face opponents who had beaten the offside trap. He was also highly regarded for his handling, aerial ability, and command of the area on high balls; however, throughout his career, Buffon has occasionally been accused by pundits of being overly cautious on crosses and of not always coming out to collect them, and has also drawn criticism for preferring to punch the ball out to his teammates at times rather than holding on to it. Although not as adept with the ball at his feet as the newer generation of goalkeepers that emerged in his later career, Buffon also possesses good footwork, as well as reliable distribution, which has enabled him to adapt to more contemporary systems, which require goalkeepers to play with their feet more frequently and be involved in the build-up of plays; his confidence in possession allows him to play the ball out from the back on the ground to his defenders and start swift counter-attacks, or find his teammates further up the pitch or out on the wing with deeper kicks with his right foot. In his youth, his ball skills even occasionally led him to take on opponents, whenever he was put under pressure by on-running strikers.

After struggling with a series of injuries between 2008 and 2010, Buffon effectively adapted his style of goalkeeping to the physical effects of ageing, while also modifying his diet and training regime, and as a result, has developed into a less spectacular, but more efficient, calm, and reflective goalkeeper; despite the loss of some of his physical strength, explosiveness, speed and mobility, he has continued to excel at the highest level due to the consistency of his performances, as well as his positioning between the posts, tactical intelligence, decision-making, and his ability to read the game and organise his defence. In contrast with his goalkeeping style in his early career, Buffon has often preferred to position himself in deeper areas in his later career, closer to his line, in particular in one on one situations, in order to increase the distance between himself and his opponent, giving himself more time to assess situations and parry the ball. In addition to his goalkeeping abilities, Buffon has been singled out for his charisma, strong mentality, discipline in training, vocal presence in goal, and leadership, and has been described as "a key dressing room personality".

Legacy 
Buffon is widely regarded by players, pundits and managers as one of the greatest goalkeepers of all time, and by some in the sport as the greatest ever. In the introduction of his 2008 autobiography, Numero 1 (Number 1), Roberto Perrone describes him as: "the greatest goalkeeper in the world, one of the four or five that will always live on in the memory of world football". In 2012, he was voted the 20th best footballer in the world by The Guardian, finishing as the second highest ranked goalkeeper, behind Iker Casillas. Buffon was awarded the Nereo Rocco Prize on 2 September 2014, which is given to a footballer in recognition of their career. In 2015, France Football rated him as one of the ten best footballers in the world who are over the age of 36. In 2016, he was named the greatest goalkeeper in history by the same magazine. Later that year, he was also named the greatest goalkeeper of all-time in the UEFA Champions League in an official UEFA online Twitter poll. In 2015, UEFA ranked him as the third–best player ever not to have won the UEFA Champions League, while in 2019, FourFourTwo placed Buffon at number two behind only Ronaldo in their list of "The 25 best players never to win the Champions League". In May 2020, Sky Sports ranked him as the fourth–best player ever to have not won the Champions League or European Cup, and he was also voted the "Greatest Goalkeeper Ever" by users of  Eurosport.com.

Attire 
Although when he started his career it was more common for goalkeepers to wear long-sleeved jerseys, Buffon has always been known for wearing short-sleeves throughout his entire career, even during the winter months; when asked in a 2017 interview with FourFourTwo why he preferred to wear short sleeves, he commented: "I really don't know why. It's just something that I've always done, right from the time I first started playing in goal. It always felt good. And now look: lots of goalkeepers do it. I've started a fashion." When asked again about his goalkeeping attire in a 2018 interview with L'Équipe's magazine Sports et Style, he stated that he first cut the sleeves off of his goalkeeping kit as a youngster, "for convenience and to feel more comfortable", also adding that he "feel[s] more when the ball touches [his] forearms".

Outside of professional football

Personal life 
Buffon was born into a family of Italian athletes on 28 January 1978. His mother, Maria Stella, was a discus thrower and his father, Adriano, was a weightlifter. Following their athletic retirement, they subsequently worked as P.E. school teachers. Buffon's two sisters, Veronica and Guendalina, played volleyball for the Italian national volleyball team, and his uncle, Dante Masocco, was a basketball player in Serie A1, who also represented the national team. Former Milan, Inter, and Italy goalkeeper Lorenzo Buffon is also a cousin of Gianluigi Buffon's grandfather. Buffon is Catholic.

Buffon married Czech model Alena Šeredová in June 2011, although they had been in a relationship since 2005. They have two children, Louis Thomas (born in 2007 and named after Buffon's idol Thomas N'Kono) and David Lee (born in 2009 and named after Van Halen singer David Lee Roth). In May 2014, Buffon announced that he had separated from his wife after three years of marriage. He was soon romantically linked to Italian sports pundit, journalist and television host Ilaria D'Amico. In 2015, Buffon announced that the couple were expecting a child together. On 6 January 2016, the couple announced the birth of their son Leopoldo Mattia. In the summer of 2017, the pair became engaged. Prior to his relationship with and marriage to Šeredová, Buffon had also previously been engaged to a sprinter from the Italy national athletics team, Vincenza Calì.

On 14 November 2008, Buffon released the Italian edition of his autobiography, Numero 1 (Number 1), which was written in collaboration with writer and Corriere della Sera journalist Roberto Perrone. In his autobiography, he revealed that he had suffered with bouts of depression during the 2003–04 season, following Juventus' penalty shoot-out defeat in the 2003 Champions League final, and due to Juventus' negative performance that season. In 2013, he elaborated that, between December 2003 and June 2004, he regularly visited a psychologist, but refused to take medication, and he overcame his depression prior to Euro 2004. In January 2019, he further revealed that he had even suffered from panic attacks due to his depression during his early career with Juventus, and that he even missed a game as a result.

Buffon suffers from spheksophobia, as he is allergic to wasp stings.

In his youth, Buffon supported a number of clubs, including his hometown club Carrarese, along with Genoa, and German side Borussia Mönchengladbach; up until the age of seven, he also supported Juventus, while between the ages of eight and twelve, he was a fan of Inter – due to his admiration for manager Giovanni Trapattoni – as well as Pescara, Como, Avellino, and Campobasso, before eventually supporting Genoa. He was a member of the ultras of Carrarese, specifically the "Commando Ultrà Indian Tips", and to this day, he still has the group's name printed on his goalkeeping gloves.

AIC 
On 7 May 2012, Buffon was elected vice-president of the Italian Footballers' Association (AIC); this was the first time an active footballer had held this position.

Media and endorsements 
Buffon has been sponsored by German sportswear company Puma during his career, wearing Puma gloves and Puma King football boots, and has appeared in Puma commercials. Buffon has also featured in Pepsi commercials, including an advertisement for the 2002 World Cup in Korea and Japan, where he lined up alongside several other footballers, including David Beckham, Raúl and Roberto Carlos, in taking on a team of sumo players. In 2009, Buffon, an avid poker player and gambler, was hired by PokerStars to endorse their products.

Buffon was featured on the cover of the Italian edition of Konami's PES 2008, alongside global coverstar Cristiano Ronaldo. Buffon also features in EA Sports' FIFA video game series, and was named alongside Manuel Neuer, Iker Casillas and Petr Čech in the Ultimate Team Best Goalkeepers in FIFA 14.

In 2011, he featured in a commercial for Italian mineral water company Ferrarelle.

In 2016, Buffon was chosen as the new face of Amica Chips. The following year, he was instead chosen as the new face of Head & Shoulders in Italy.

Throughout the 2017–18 season, Buffon appeared in the Netflix docu-series called First Team: Juventus.

In May 2018, Buffon announced his partnership with the video game World of Tanks. Late that same year, he also featured in a commercial for Birra Moretti.

In December 2019, Buffon announced his collaboration with the Spanish clothing and accessories retailer Kimoa, which is owned by Spanish race car driver Fernando Alonso, to release four different limited edition models of sunglasses, which represent four European cities associated with Buffon's football career and achievements: Berlin (the location of the victorious 2006 World Cup Final), Moscow (the city in which he made his international debut and won the UEFA Cup), Paris (the city in which his former club PSG is based), and Turin (the city in which his club at the time, Juventus, is based).

In January 2020, Buffon made a cameo appearance in the music video for "Ti saprò aspettare" by Biagio Antonacci, where he coaches a children's football team against Antonacci as the opposing coach. In the last scene, Buffon takes a shot on Antonacci as goalkeeper, with the video intentionally stopping before the ball is either scored or saved.

Business 
On 16 July 2010, Buffon became a share-holding partner of his hometown club Carrarese; he initially owned 50% of the club's shares, along with Cristiano Lucarelli and Maurizio Mian. On 10 June 2011, he acquired an additional 20% of the club's shares. On 6 July 2012, Buffon become the sole shareholder of Carrarese through his family's company, Buffon & co. In May 2015, Buffon stated that he would be stepping down from his position as the owner of Carrarese at the end of the 2014–15 season; in July, he sold 70% of Carrarese's shares to the Italian real estate developer Raffaele Tartaglia, who took control of the club, although Buffon still remained with the club as a minority shareholder. After continuing to struggle with financial difficulties, the club officially declared bankruptcy on 11 March 2016.

On 30 May 2011, he joined the board of directors of the Italian textile company Zucchi Group S.p.A., with a share of 19.4%. Despite the company's financial difficulties, in 2015, Buffon, who had by then acquired 56% of the company's shares, had reportedly invested €20 million in order to save the company from bankruptcy. In late December, Zucchi was acquired by a French investment fund, Astrance Capital, which took control of Buffon's company GB Holding, under an agreement to restructure Zucchi Group's debt, while Buffon was allowed to retain a 15% share in the company.

In 2017, Buffon launched his own brand of wine under the name "Buffon #1".

Philanthropy 
Buffon is also known for his charity work. In addition to his other charitable endeavours, after every match he auctions off his personalised captain's armband for charity.

In 2012, Buffon joined the "Respect Diversity" Programme, through UEFA, which aimed to fight against racism, discrimination and intolerance in football.

On 1 September 2014, Buffon, along with many current and former footballing stars, took part in the "Match for Peace", which was played at Rome's Stadio Olimpico, with the proceeds being donated to charity.

In October 2019, Buffon was named a UN Goodwill Ambassador for the World Food Programme.

Politics 
Prior to the 2013 Italian general election, Buffon publicly endorsed the prime minister at the time, Mario Monti. Buffon was one of over 80 Italian celebrities to sign a petition in favour of the 2016 Italian constitutional referendum promoted by the Democratic Party under then prime minister Matteo Renzi.

Controversy 
While at Parma, Buffon's decision to wear the number 88 shirt, rather than his previous number 1 shirt, for the 2000–01 season caused controversy in Italy. Buffon claimed to be unaware of the number's neo-Nazi connotations, stating that 88 represented "four balls", which are symbols of the character and attributes of a person. He stated that they were meant to signify his need for these attributes after his injury prior to Euro 2000, and that they also represented his "rebirth". He subsequently offered to change numbers, choosing the squad number 77 instead.

In September 1999, Buffon faced heavy criticism and severe disciplinary sanctions for bearing the Italian fascist slogan Boia chi molla ("Who gives up is a scoundrel") handwritten on a T-shirt under his goalkeeping jersey, which he wore and showed during media interviews after a match against Lazio. Buffon publicly apologised, stating that it was a stupid and naïve gesture because he was completely ignorant of the slogan's neo-fascist connotations, stating that he had first encountered the slogan written on a boarding school desk, and was unaware of its far right-wing association and, in particular, its use with the neo-fascists in Reggio Calabria during the Reggio revolt in the early 1970s. He declared that he merely intended to use the slogan to spur on his teammates and the fans, as Parma had previously encountered some disappointing results.

In 2000, Buffon risked a four-year prison sentence for falsifying a high school accounting diploma in order to enroll for a law degree at the University of Parma, and ultimately paid a 6,350,000 Lire fine in 2001; he later described the incident as his biggest regret in life, stating that it had been a dishonest gesture.

On 12 May 2006, during the height of the Calciopoli scandal, Buffon was accused of illegally betting on Serie A matches, which initially put his place in Italy's 2006 World Cup squad at risk. Buffon was formally interrogated and admitted placing bets on sporting matches until players were forbidden from doing so in October 2005, but denied ever placing wagers on Italian football matches. He was cleared of all charges in December 2006. Following Italy's 2006 World Cup victory celebrations at Circus Maximus in Rome in July, he attracted further controversy when he distractedly displayed a banner he had received from the crowd, with the writing "Fieri di essere italiani" ("Proud to be Italian"), as well as a Celtic cross, a symbol adopted by neo–Nazis into the 21st century; Buffon later stated that he had not seen the symbol.

On 11 April 2018, in the 2017–18 UEFA Champions League quarter-final second leg away to Real Madrid, Juventus needed a 3–0 win to force extra time, which was the scoreline when, deep into second-half stoppage time, referee Michael Oliver awarded a penalty to Real Madrid. Buffon was sent off for dissent after a confrontation with Oliver; Juventus were eliminated from the Champions League as the resulting penalty kick was converted by Cristiano Ronaldo.

Buffon's post-match comments made about Oliver drew much media attention and controversy:

On 11 May, Buffon was charged by UEFA over post-match comments made about referee Oliver, and later, on 5 June, the UEFA Control, Ethics and Disciplinary Body gave Buffon a three-match ban for UEFA competition matches "for which he would be otherwise eligible". Buffon later issued an apology, stating:

Career statistics

Club

International

Honours 
Parma
 Coppa Italia: 1998–99
 Supercoppa Italiana: 1999
 UEFA Cup: 1998–99

Juventus
 Serie A: 2001–02, 2002–03, 2011–12, 2012–13, 2013–14, 2014–15, 2015–16, 2016–17, 2017–18, 2019–20
 Serie B: 2006–07
 Coppa Italia: 2014–15, 2015–16, 2016–17, 2017–18, 2020–21
 Supercoppa Italiana: 2002, 2003, 2012, 2013, 2015, 2020
 UEFA Champions League runner-up: 2002–03, 2014–15, 2016–17

Paris Saint-Germain
 Ligue 1: 2018–19
 Trophée des Champions: 2018

Italy U21
 UEFA European Under-21 Championship: 1996
 Mediterranean Games: 1997

Italy
 FIFA World Cup: 2006
 UEFA European Championship runner-up: 2012
 FIFA Confederations Cup third place: 2013

Individual
 Bravo Award: 1999
 Serie A Goalkeeper of the Year Award: 1999, 2001, 2002, 2003, 2004, 2005, 2006, 2008, 2012, 2014, 2015, 2016, 2017
 UEFA Club Goalkeeper of the Year: 2002–03
 UEFA Club Footballer of the Year: 2002–03
 UEFA Team of the Year: 2003, 2004, 2006, 2016, 2017
 ESM Team of the Year: 2002–03, 2016–17
 Best European Goalkeeper: 2003, 2016, 2017
 IFFHS World's Best Goalkeeper: 2003, 2004, 2006, 2007, 2017
 IFFHS World's Best Goalkeeper: Runner-up 2008, 2009, 2012, 2013, 2015, 2016
 IFFHS World's Best Goalkeeper: 3rd place 2001, 2005, 2018
 FIFA 100
 FIFA World Cup Yashin Award: 2006
 FIFA World Cup All-Star Team: 2006
 Serie A "Fan" Award: 2006, 2007
 FIFA FIFPro World XI: 2006, 2007, 2017
 UEFA European Championship Team of the Tournament: 2008, 2012
 Sports Illustrated Team of the Decade: 2009
 ESPN World Team of the Decade: 2009
 IFFHS Best Goalkeeper of the Decade 2001–2011
 IFFHS Best Goalkeeper of the 21st Century 2001–2020
 IFFHS Best Goalkeeper of the Past 25 Years: 1987–2012
 IFFHS All Time World's Best Goalkeeper: 1987–2020
 Serie A Team of the Year: 2012, 2014, 2015, 2016, 2017
 Pallone Azzurro: 2013, 2016
 UEFA Europa League Squad of the Season: 2013–14
 Premio Nereo Rocco: 2014
 UEFA Champions League Squad of the Season: 2014–15, 2016–17
 UEFA Ultimate Team of the Year substitute (published 2015)
 France Football World XI: 2015
 Gianni Brera Award for Sportsman of the Year: 2015
 Juventus MVP of the Year: 2015–16
 UEFA Euro All-time XI (published 2016)
 Premio Nazionale Carriera Esemplare "Gaetano Scirea": 2016
 Golden Foot: 2016
 Serie A Footballer of the Year: 2016–17
 The Best FIFA Goalkeeper: 2017
 UEFA Champions League Goalkeeper of the Season: 2016–17
 IFFHS Men's World Team: 2017
 Gazzetta Sports Awards Man of the Year: 2017
 Juventus Greatest XI of All Time: 2017
 Ballon d'Or Dream Team (Bronze): 2020
 IFFHS All-time Men's B Dream Team: 2021

Records
 Most appearances in Serie A: 657 (as of 12 May 2021)
 Second-most appearances for Juventus in all competitions: 685, behind Alessandro Del Piero, 705 (as of 19 May 2021)
 Most appearances for Juventus in Serie A: 489 (as of 12 May 2021)
 Most appearances for Juventus in Italian League matches (includes Serie A and Serie B): 526 (as of 12 May 2021)
 Most appearances for Juventus in the Supercoppa Italiana: 8
 Most appearances for Juventus in the UEFA Champions League: 117 (including 4 in the qualifying rounds) (as of 8 December 2020)
 Most appearances for Juventus in UEFA club competitions: 126 (as of 8 December 2020)
 Second-most appearances for Juventus in international club competitions: 126, behind Alessandro Del Piero, 130 (as of 8 December 2020)
 Joint-most appearances for Juventus in Serie B: 37, alongside Federico Balzaretti and Alessandro Birindelli
 Most all-time minutes played for Juventus in all competitions: 61,412 (as of 19 May 2021)
 Most all-time minutes played for Juventus in Serie A: 43,549 (as of 12 May 2021)
 Most career club appearances by an Italian player: 967 (as of 11 March 2023)
 Most appearances in Europe's top five leagues: 674 (657 in Serie A and 17 in Ligue 1) (as of 12 May 2021)
 Most appearances for Italy senior team: 176
 Most all-time minutes played for Italy senior team: 15,251
 Most appearances for Italy in FIFA World Cup qualification matches: 39
 Most appearances for Italy in UEFA European Championship matches: 17
 Most appearances for Italy in UEFA European Championship qualifying matches: 41
 Most appearances for Italy in UEFA European Championship (final tournament and qualifying matches): 58
 Joint-most appearances for Italy in FIFA Confederations Cup matches: 8, alongside Giorgio Chiellini and Riccardo Montolivo
 Most appearances as captain for Italy senior team: 80
 Most goalkeeper appearances as captain for Italy senior team: 80
 Most appearances as captain at the UEFA European Championship: 13
 Most appearances by a goalkeeper at the UEFA European Championship: 17
 Joint-fewest goals conceded in a single FIFA World Cup edition by a starting World Cup winning goalkeeper: 2 goals in 7 appearances at the 2006 World Cup, alongside Iker Casillas in 2010 and Fabien Barthez in 1998
 Joint-fewest goals conceded in a single UEFA European Championship edition (at least 3 matches played): 1 goal in 4 appearances at Euro 2016, alongside Iker Casillas in 2012, Thomas Myhre in 2000 and Dino Zoff in 1968
 Joint-most clean sheets in a single World Cup edition: 5 at the 2006 World Cup, alongside Iker Casillas in 2010, Oliver Kahn in 2002, Fabien Barthez in 1998 and Walter Zenga in 1990
 Longest consecutive run without conceding a goal in a single Serie A season: 974 minutes in 2015–16
 Most consecutive clean sheets in a single Serie A season: 10 in 2015–16
 Most clean sheets in a single Serie A season: 21 in 2011–12 and 2015–16
 Longest consecutive run without conceding a goal in the qualifying stages of the UEFA European Championship: 644 minutes in 2010 and 2011
 One of only four players to take part in five FIFA World Cups: 1998, 2002, 2006, 2010 and 2014, alongside Antonio Carbajal, Rafael Márquez and Lothar Matthäus
 One of seventeen players to play in four UEFA European Championships: 2004, 2008, 2012 and 2016
 Most clean sheets for Italy senior team: 77
 Most clean sheets for Italy at the FIFA World Cup: 6
 Most clean sheets for Italy at the UEFA European Championship: 8
 Most clean sheets for Italy at the FIFA Confederations Cup: 1
 Most clean sheets for Italy in FIFA World Cup qualification matches: 21
 Most clean sheets for Italy in UEFA European Championship qualifying matches: 23
 Most clean sheets in Serie A: 299 (as of 22 February 2021)
 Most clean sheets by a goalkeeper in men's association football: 500 (as of 5 February 2022)
 Joint second-most clean sheets in the UEFA Champions League: 52 (excluding 3 in the qualifying rounds), behind Iker Casillas, 57 (excluding 2 in qualifying) (as of 8 December 2020)
 Most appearances in the UEFA Champions League by an Italian player: 124 (excluding 8 in the qualifying rounds) (as of 8 December 2020)
 Joint twelfth-most appearances in the UEFA Champions League era: 124 (excluding 8 in the qualifying rounds), alongside Paul Scholes (as of 13 April 2021)
 Sixth-most appearances in UEFA club competitions: 167 (124 in the UEFA Champions League, 8 in the UEFA Champions League qualifying rounds and 35 in the UEFA Cup/Europa League) (as of 8 December 2020)
 Third-longest consecutive run without conceding a goal in the UEFA Champions League: 690 minutes in 2016–17, behind Ederson, 706, and Jens Lehmann, 853
 Second-most appearances by a goalkeeper in the UEFA Champions League: 132 (including 8 in the qualifying rounds), behind Iker Casillas, 181 (including 4 in qualifying rounds) (as of 8 December 2020)
 Third-most appearances by a goalkeeper in UEFA club competitions: 167, behind Iker Casillas, 188, and Pepe Reina, 177 (as of 23 February 2021)
 Most UEFA Champions League Final appearances without a victory: 3, alongside Paolo Montero
 Most penalties saved for Italy senior team: 5
 Joint-most penalties saved in shoot-outs at the UEFA European Championship: 3, alongside Iker Casillas
 Joint third-most penalties saved in the UEFA Champions League (excluding shoot-outs): 4 (out of 13), alongside Manuel Neuer (out of 11), and behind Iker Casillas, 7 (out of 23) and Petr Čech, 5 (out of 11)
 Third-most senior international appearances by a European footballer: 176, behind Sergio Ramos, 180, and Cristiano Ronaldo, 179
 Joint seventh-most senior international appearances: 176
 Most appearances in UEFA European Championship (final tournament and qualifying matches): 58
 Only goalkeeper to ever win the UEFA Club Footballer of the Year Award: 2003
 Most Serie A titles won by a player: 10 (all with Juventus)
 Third-most consecutive Serie A titles: 7, alongside Stephan Lichtsteiner and Claudio Marchisio, behind Andrea Barzagli, 8 and Giorgio Chiellini, 9
 Joint-most Supercoppa Italiana titles: 6 (1 with Parma and 5 with Juventus), alongside Dejan Stanković
 Joint-most Coppa Italia titles: 6 (1 with Parma and 5 with Juventus), alongside Roberto Mancini
 Most Serie A Goalkeeper of the Year awards: 13
 Joint-most IFFHS World's Best Goalkeeper Awards: 5, alongside Iker Casillas and Manuel Neuer
 Most Top 3 IFFHS World's Best Goalkeeper Awards: 14 (5 #1, 6 #2 & 3 #3)
 Most Pallone Azzurro Awards: 2
 Third-most expensive goalkeeper of all time: €52 million, behind Kepa Arrizabalaga, €80 million and Alisson Becker, €72.5 million
 Most titles won with Juventus: 21
 Second-oldest player to appear in Serie A: , behind Marco Ballotta, 44 years, 38 days (as of 12 May 2021)
 Second-oldest goalkeeper to appear in the UEFA Champions League: , behind Marco Ballotta, 43 years, 252 days (as of 8 December 2020)

Orders
  CONI: Golden Collar of Sports Merit: 2006

  4th Class / Officer: Ufficiale Ordine al Merito della Repubblica Italiana: 2006

See also 
 List of footballers with 100 or more UEFA Champions League appearances
 List of men's footballers with 100 or more international caps
 List of men's footballers with the most official appearances

Notes

References

Bibliography 
Gianluigi Buffon, Roberto Perrone, Numero 1, Milan, Rizzoli, 2007,  (Number 1).

External links 

 
 Juventus official profile
 PSG official profile 
 
 Profile at legaseriea.it 
 Profile at aic.football.it 
 
 FIGC official profile 
 Profile at Italia1910.com 
 

1978 births
Living people
People from Carrara
Sportspeople from the Province of Massa-Carrara
Italian Roman Catholics
Italian footballers
Association football goalkeepers
Parma Calcio 1913 players
Juventus F.C. players
Paris Saint-Germain F.C. players
Serie A players
Serie B players
Ligue 1 players
UEFA Cup winning players
Italy youth international footballers
Italy under-21 international footballers
Olympic footballers of Italy
Italy international footballers
Footballers at the 1996 Summer Olympics
Competitors at the 1997 Mediterranean Games
1998 FIFA World Cup players
2002 FIFA World Cup players
UEFA Euro 2004 players
2006 FIFA World Cup players
UEFA Euro 2008 players
2009 FIFA Confederations Cup players
2010 FIFA World Cup players
UEFA Euro 2012 players
2013 FIFA Confederations Cup players
2014 FIFA World Cup players
UEFA Euro 2016 players
Mediterranean Games gold medalists for Italy
Mediterranean Games medalists in football
FIFA World Cup-winning players
FIFA Century Club
FIFA 100
UEFA Men's Player of the Year Award winners
Italian expatriate footballers
Italian expatriate sportspeople in France
Expatriate footballers in France
Officers of the Order of Merit of the Italian Republic
People of Friulian descent
Footballers from Tuscany
Gianluigi
Italian autobiographers